Dr. John H.A.L. de Jong (born 22 June 1947, The Hague) graduated in General Linguistics, French and English languages from Leiden University and obtained a Ph.D. in Educational Measurement from Twente University. He has published numerous articles and books on language acquisition and assessment and on educational measurement. He is specialized in the empirical scaling of language proficiency and promotes the development of internationally standardized reporting scales of language proficiency. He was involved from the start in developing the Common European Framework of Reference for Languages.

After teaching French for seven years John continued his career at CITO, the Dutch National Institute for Educational Management. In 2000 he set up a company, "Language Testing Services" (LTS), to provide advice and services in the areas of language curriculum development, language testing and assessment in general to national and international educational authorities, educational institutions and international business corporations. In September 2006 he joined Pearson Language Tests as Vice President Test Development and developed a new computer based test of academic English, Pearson Test of English. John has now moved on within Pearson English as Senior Vice President Standards and Quality.

He has been appointed Chair in Language Testing at VU University Amsterdam, supervising research in the area of language testing & language proficiency modeling.

References

External links 
 European Language Testing Association profile

Living people
1947 births
Linguists from the Netherlands
Scientists from The Hague
Leiden University alumni
Academic staff of Vrije Universiteit Amsterdam